Nativity 3: Dude, Where's My Donkey?! is the third instalment of the Nativity film series by Debbie Isitt. It stars Martin Clunes, Marc Wootton, Catherine Tate with Celia Imrie and Jason Watkins. Like its predecessors, it was distributed by Entertainment One.

Plot
Jeremy Shepherd is an Ofsted inspector who is the father of Lauren and is due to marry his fiancée Sophie in New York City. He is hit in the forehead by Mr Poppy's pet donkey Archie. He has amnesia and no memory of anything that happened before. Mr Poppy and the children have to get Mr Shepherd's memory back before the big day as well as stopping the flashmobber Bradley Finch from stealing Sophie back.

Cast
Martin Clunes as Jeremy Shepherd
Marc Wootton as Desmond Poppy
Catherine Tate as Sophie Ford
Celia Imrie as Mrs. Keen
Jason Watkins as Gordon Shakespeare
Stewart Wright as Uncle Henry
Adam Garcia as Bradley Finch
Ralf Little as Charlie Ford 
Duncan Preston as Sophie’s Father
Susie Blake as Sophie’s Mother
Lauren Hobbs as Lauren Shepherd
Amy Adams as Adult Lauren Shepherd (voice)
Bella Thorne as Lauren's Singing Voice
David Hunter as Mr. Parker

Reception
The film was panned by critics. On review aggregation website Rotten Tomatoes, the film holds an approval rating of 16% based on 19 reviews, with an average rating of 3.14/10. 

Peter Bradshaw of The Guardian gave the film one star out of five, comparing it to "A John Lewis Christmas ad directed by Satan". Bradshaw added "This is one of those British family comedies that make you want to soil the Union flag with your own faeces in the cinema foyer before setting fire to it. Robbie Collin of The Daily Telegraph called the film "a garbled, sprayed-around mess", in his one star review and added, "As soon as I left the cinema, I went looking for a donkey to kick me in the head."

Isitt defended the film following its scathing reception, saying "These critics are just so out of touch with what people like and want." In response to Bradshaws scathing review, Isitt stated, "What on earth is wrong with Peter Bradshaw? He is disgusting and like a troll and should be ashamed of himself. Was he sent to boarding school and abandoned? Perhaps he’s insane".In response to Collins review, Isitt said "I would do it for free… and in my high heels".

When the film was released in the United Kingdom, it opened at #3, behind Interstellar and The Imitation Game.

See also
 2014 in film
 List of British films of 2014

References

External links
 

2014 films
British Christmas comedy films
Films shot in England
Films shot in London
Films shot in New York City
Films shot in the United States
2010s Christmas comedy films
2014 comedy films
2010s English-language films
2010s British films